Khmeleva is a village located on the Dnister River in Chortkiv Raion of Ternopil Oblast, in western Ukraine. Khmeleva is the administrative center of the village council, which also includes the village of Svershkivtsi. It belongs to Tovste settlement hromada, one of the hromadas of Ukraine.

Population of the village as of 2007 was 442.

Until 18 July 2020, Khmeleva belonged to Zalishchyky Raion. The raion was abolished in July 2020 as part of the administrative reform of Ukraine, which reduced the number of raions of Ternopil Oblast to three. The area of Zalishchyky Raion was merged into Chortkiv Raion.

Notable people

Born 
 agronomist researcher, social and political activist Roman Kotsyk,

Lived 
 Yakub Holovatsky, writer, folklorist, Slavist scholar. His baby son is buried in the village.

References

External links 
 . — S. 591—592.

Villages in Chortkiv Raion